Julodis cirrosa, common name Brush Jewel Beetle, is a species of beetles belonging to the Buprestidae family. This species occurs in Southern Africa.

Description
The coloration is metallic blue-green, the surface is punctured and covered by yellowish-orange wax-coated hairs.

List of Subspecies
 Julodis cirrosa cirrosa (Schönherr, 1817)
 Julodis cirrosa hirtiventris Laporte, 1835

References
 Universal Biological Indexer
 Biolib
 S.M.V. Gussmann New species and subspecies of Julodis Eschscholtz (Coleoptera: Buprestidae) from southern Africa

External links
 Roma scuola

Buprestidae
Beetles described in 1817